Juliusruh is a village on the northern coast of the island of Rügen in northeastern Germany. Juliusruh is part of the municipality of Breege. Juliusruh and Breege combined have  821 inhabitants in an area of 15,99 km² (approx. 6 sq miles).

Tourism is Juliusruh's economic mainstay.

A facility for atmospheric research, the Ionosonde Juliusruh is located nearby.

Villages in Mecklenburg-Western Pomerania
Towns and villages on Rügen
Wittow